Seada is a Sardinian dessert. It is prepared by deep-frying a large semolina dumpling (usually between 8 and 10 cm in diameter) with a filling of soured Pecorino cheese and lemon peel in olive oil or lard, and is served covered with honey, sugar and, sometimes, salt.

References 

 
 
 

Cuisine of Sardinia
Italian desserts